Otacilio Jales da Silva Neto, known as Otacilio Jales or just Otacilio (born 2 January 1984) is a Brazilian former professional footballer who played as a defensive midfielder.

Career
Otacilio is a youth product of Santa Cruz. In April 2006, he left for Série B club Remo and in January 2007 he joined 2. Bundesliga club Eintracht Braunschweig. The team was relegated at the end of season. Otacilio then left for São Caetano of Campeonato Brasileiro Série B in August 2007. He made his club debut on 7 September (round 24), replacing Gláucio in 72nd minute, winning Paulista FC 1–0.

In January 2008, he transferred to Náutico of Campeonato Pernambucano, but was released in May. In August he left for Gama of Série B. He just started once and collected three more substitute appearances for the club. Gama was relegated to 2009 Campeonato Brasileiro Série C at the end of season.

In February 2009, he was signed by Vila Nova on a one-year contract.

In February 2010, he was re-signed by Remo, agreeing a contract until the end of 2010 Campeonato Paraense or 15 June.

After being without a club for six months, he was signed by Mirassol on 7 December 2010. He was released prior the start of the 2011 Brazilian fourth division, for which the team qualified as São Paulo state championship second best team (seventh) that not played in any superior division above fourth division. The team also finished as the losing semi-finalists (first round) of 2011 Campeonato Paulista do Interior.

In July 2011, he joined the third division club Campinense but was released again in September, as the club failed to qualify to the stage two of the tournament.

References

External links
 
 

1984 births
Living people
Brazilian footballers
Santa Cruz Futebol Clube players
Clube do Remo players
Eintracht Braunschweig players
Associação Desportiva São Caetano players
Clube Náutico Capibaribe players
Sociedade Esportiva do Gama players
Vila Nova Futebol Clube players
Mirassol Futebol Clube players
Campinense Clube players
Association football midfielders
Brazilian expatriate footballers
Brazilian expatriate sportspeople in Germany
Expatriate footballers in Germany
Sportspeople from Rio Grande do Norte
2. Bundesliga players